Headway Arts, incorporated in 1995 as Headstrong Productions, is an independent arts organisation and registered charity based in Blyth, Northumberland. 

It focuses on participatory arts, providing opportunities for people to gain access to the arts. 

It aims to engage people who are socially excluded, with a focus on working with young people and adults with learning disability.

Its programmes include:
 Come on Down - an annual festival to celebrate work created by learning-disabled people.
 Random - an ongoing youth theatre funded by BBC Children in Need
 Seven Stars - Northumberland's learning disabled theatre company supported by the Northern Rock Foundation.

Headway Arts raises funds from grant applications, donations and through sales of professional creative and arts-based training workshops.

International work 
Headway Arts is also engaged in international collaborative work with support from the European Union, and since 2009 has attracted Grundtvig funding for partnership work linking with community and arts initiatives in Belgium, Ireland, Italy, Lithuania, Malta, Portugal, Slovenia, Spain and Sweden.

Awards 
Most Exciting Project at North East VCS Awards 2009
Leading Visionary of the Future in Europe in European Year of Creativity & Innovation 2009
NIACE Outstanding Achievement Award 2010
Best Animated Film (Rosemary's Birthday) and Best Fantasy Film (Robots in Space) at 2010 D'Oscar Awards

References

External links 
 Official site

Charity fundraisers